Doug Van Gundy is a poet and musician from Elkins, West Virginia. His first book of poems, A Life Above Water, was published by Red Hen Press in 2007. He also plays fiddle, guitar, mandolin, and banjo in the old-time string band, Born Old.

In August 1999, Van Gundy was a contestant of ABC's Who Wants to be a Millionaire, and became the first contestant to win $250,000 on the show. On the $100 question he used the Ask the Audience lifeline, but the question was later deemed ambiguous, and his lifeline was returned to him. He would later win $64,000 without using another lifeline. The $125,000 question asked where Oswald was arrested for Kennedy's assassination—answer, a movie theater. He asked the audience and got the correct answer. On the $250,000 question, he was asked where the Iditarod Dogsled race ends. He used the 50/50, and then called his friend Ross, and also got the correct answer, Nome.

References

External links
 Web site of Doug Van Gundy

American male poets
Contestants on American game shows
Living people
Musicians from West Virginia
People from Elkins, West Virginia
Who Wants to Be a Millionaire?
Poets from West Virginia
1966 births